The University of Chicago Undergraduate Student Government is the representative student government at The University of Chicago for undergraduate students. It is made up of all undergraduate students, and allocates over $2 million per year to Registered Student Organizations, student initiatives, sports clubs, and other various student-run organizations. Student Government also sponsors initiatives that address pressing issues on campus, from sexual assault policy to accessibility for students with disabilities. Student Government seeks to play a role in all aspects of University life, from housing and diversity to funding and dining.

Executive pay controversy 
In spring 2018, the student government voted to pass the Executive Leadership Remuneration Act (ELRA), which would pay the student body president and vice presidents a total of $9000 per year, to be paid by Student Life Fees collected from the undergraduate body. The move was widely unpopular among the student population and was seen as self-serving, leading to a grassroots effort to trigger a school-wide referendum on repealing the ELRA bill. Ultimately, the referendum succeeded and the ELRA was repealed by a large margin (the vote count was 1,138 to 531).

References

University of Chicago
Student governments in the United States